Sport in China has been long associated with the martial arts. Today, China (including mainland China, Hong Kong, and Macau) consists of a variety of competitive sports. Traditional Chinese culture regards physical fitness as an important characteristic. China has its own national quadrennial multi-sport event similar to the Olympic Games called the National Games.

Before the 1980s, the country's international sports success was mainly in table tennis. This changed with the 1981 FIVB Volleyball Women's World Cup where the Chinese women won the gold medal amidst enormous public attention.

Prior to the 1990s, sports were entirely funded by the government. Top athletes quit at the height of their careers due to uncertainty about their livelihoods after retirement.

In 1994, Chinese association football was professionalized, followed by basketball, volleyball, ping pong, and weiqi. Professionalization led to commercialization; this meant that sports associations became profit-making entities and that a club system and professional sports leagues were formed. Sports club operations now cover ticket sales, advertising, club transfers, commercial matches, and television broadcasting. Chinese athletes have also begun joining professional leagues abroad, such as basketball Yao Ming's entry into the United States' NBA in the 2002 draft.

In September 2007, the Yao Ming and Yi Jianlian basketball matchup drew China's largest audience ever for a single sports game as 100–200 million Chinese watched live. China Daily reported that Virtually the whole nation stands glued to their television sets, amid parties and wild celebrations.

China led the gold medal count (48) at the 2008 Summer Olympics in Beijing. The event was scheduled for August 8 to August 24, 2008, because the number 8 is a lucky number in Chinese culture. China hosted the 2014 Summer Youth Olympics from August 16 to 28, 2014.

In 2017, a football match in the Tianhe Stadium in Guangzhou drew the largest audience for a single sporting event within the boundaries of mainland China. The average attendance of the Chinese Super League games in 2017 was 23,766 spectators.

Beijing was the host of the 2022 Winter Olympics.

History
Dragon boat racing dates back about 2000 years ago and remains a traditional event held around China every year. Cuju, a game similar but not related to the modern game of football, was played in China during the 2nd and 3rd centuries BC. Qigong martial arts activities became popular in China.

Modern sports appeared in China at the beginning of the 20th century, largely under the influence of the American YMCA and Chinese reformers interested in adopting and adapting physical education models from the U.S., Europe, and Japan. The People's Republic of China (PRC) emphasizes sports and the government funds and trains talented youngsters into professional players, especially beginning in the mid-20th century. Ping pong is one of the biggest amateur recreational sports with an estimated 200 million players. Badminton is also well established and popular.

According to CCTV Sports Channel, the gold-medal women's volleyball game of the 2004 Summer Olympics drew the viewership of 30% of TV-owning households; the figure was 18% for the China vs. Brazil match in the 2002 FIFA World Cup. Football and basketball are also shown on TV.

Even though Western observers tend to associate China with table tennis, badminton, martial arts, and various forms of pool, traditionally Western sports such as basketball and football are getting more and more popular. China's professional sports are in its developmental stages. They also may consist of hacky sack, or ping pong during their free time.

Types of sports

American football
American football leagues such as the American Football League of China and the China Arena Football League have been launched in recent years.

Badminton
Badminton is popular in China thanks to its relative simplicity in recreational use and inexpensive equipment. Many Chinese badminton players have gained international success and fame, especially the many Gold medalists at the BWF World Championships. It is a popular recreational, and professional sport, with amateur leagues throughout the country.

Bandy
China started a bandy development programme by organising educational days in Ürümqi in June 2009. They did not come as planned to the 2011 Asian Winter Games. However, China national bandy team debuted in the 2015 Bandy World Championship. Harbin hosted Division B of the 2018 tournament.

A picture of the team based in Harbin is available online.

The China women's national bandy team made its World Championship debut in 2016. Chengde hosted the 2018 tournament.

China has announced its intention to participate in both the men's and women's tournament of the 2019 Winter Universiade.

In terms of licensed athletes, it is the second biggest winter sport in the world.

Baseball
Baseball was first introduced in 1864 with the establishment of the Shanghai Baseball Club by American medical missionary Henry William Boone. Organized baseball games were established with a game between the St. Johns University and the Shanghai MCA baseball club in 1905. However, in 1959 Mao Zedong disbanded all the teams and outlawed baseball.

After the Cultural Revolution ended, baseball activities restarted, and the China Baseball Association formed in 1974. In 2002, the China Baseball League was formed and in 2019 China National Baseball League. China participates in the World Baseball Classic. Defeats of the national team to Taiwan, Japan, and South Korea may help change the trend as Chinese become more aware of the game's internationalization.

Basketball

Basketball is the largest spectator sport in China. China hosted the 2019 FIBA Basketball World Cup.

The game was introduced to China by American YMCA workers in 1896, just five years after Canadian-American James Naismith invented basketball in 1891 while working for the YMCA Training School in Springfield, Massachusetts.

Since Yao Ming's 2002 arrival in the NBA, basketball has become increasingly more popular. According to the Chinese Basketball Association, there is a record number of around 300 million active basketball players in China.

China's first professional team was started in Shenyang and sponsored by the Anshan Steel Company. The CBA was established in 1995, and by 2008 it had expanded to 18 teams.

The fact that the United States is starting to notice Chinese players after Yao Ming's success (compared to Wang Zhizhi and Mengke Bateer), and young CBA players such as Yi Jianlian and Sun Yue entering the NBA are a testament to basketball's increasing popularity. In 2008, Sun Yue became the latest Chinese to join the NBA by signing with the Los Angeles Lakers to a two-year contract.

Bodybuilding

Bodybuilding was introduced to China in the 1930s, before being banned in 1953 and making a reappearance in 1983 when the ban was officially lifted.

Boxing

Boxing in China first appeared in the 1920s. Professional boxing is followed by some fans in China.

Chess

China had a good result in the 2006 37th Chess Olympiad in Turin when the men's team came second behind Armenia and the women's team third for the best result overall. The Chinese progress has been underpinned by large government support and testing competition in numerous tough events. Commensurate with its status, China currently has seven hundred players, second only to Russia. However, even today countries like Russia and Israel still have an edge in experience over their Chinese counterparts.

Xiangqi is also considered a sport in China, with millions of players nationwide. There is a national Chinese chess league.

Cricket

Cricket is a fast-growing sport in China. It is already a well-established sport in Hong Kong, a former British Colony. The Chinese cricket team is the team that represents the country of the People's Republic of China in international cricket. The Chinese Cricket Association became an International Cricket Council affiliate member in 2004. The Special administrative region of Hong Kong is a member of the ICC in their own right, becoming an ICC associate member in 1969. Hence, players from Hong Kong are not eligible to represent China in international competition.

Prior to the establishment of a recognized national side, the Shanghai Cricket Club, the largest club in the country, played games against many touring sides but they do not receive official recognition from the Chinese Cricket Association.

Since September 2005, the Chinese Cricket Association has conducted 8 coaching/umpiring training courses under the assistance from the Asian Cricket Council (ACC). They're promoted in 9 cities in China, namely Beijing, Shanghai, Shenyang, Dalian, Guangzhou, Shenzhen, Chongqing, Tianjin and Jinan. More than 150 schools were involved.

In 2006, the Chinese Cricket Association set itself ambitious goals over the next 14 years:

2009: Have 720 teams across the country in a well-organized structure
2015: Have 20,000 players and 2,000 coaches
2019: Qualify for the World Cup (Failed to qualify)
2020: Gain Test status (Has not happened yet as for 2022.)

Curling
Although generally unheard of and unpopular, curling has been an improving sport for China to play. The government selected athletic individuals to play curling for China. The Chinese teams both Men and Women have improved at the international level. At the 2008 Ford World Women's Championships, the Chinese curling team consisting of Zhou Yan, Liu Yin, Wang Bingyu, and Yue Qingshuang won a surprising silver medal finish. At the 2008 World Men's Curling Championship, the Chinese didn't have as much success, but they also did very well, finishing 4th. The government is also hoping to promote the sport through Universities and Colleges. In March 2009, China became the first Asian team to win a curling world championship by beating Sweden in the final. At the 2010 Winter Olympic Games the women's team won the bronze medal, defeating Switzerland in 10 ends.

Field hockey

The China women's national field hockey team won silver at the 2008 Summer Olympics in Beijing, as well as bronze at the 2002 Women's Hockey World Cup. Also, the team won the 2002 Hockey Champions Trophy and finished second in 2004 and 2006.

Figure skating

Since the 1990s, China has been one of the top nations in the pairs events of figure skating. Shen Xue and Zhao Hongbo were very famous figure skating pair in China that received widespread media coverage during their career; they were three-time world champions and won a gold medal in Vancouver Winter Olympics 2010. Comparatively, China is weak in the other three disciplines (men's singles, ladies' singles, and ice dancing).

Football

Football earns one of the highest television ratings of any sport in the country and has been one of the most well supported sports in China ever since it was introduced in the 1900s. There is also written evidence that a game similar to football, Cuju, was first played in China around 50 BC. The current Chinese Football Association (CFA) was founded in the PRC after 1949. Its headquarters is located in Beijing, and the current chairman is Chen Xuyuan. From 1994 to 2004, the CFA established the first professional football league, which was "Jia A". The Chinese Super League (CSL) is the premier football league in China, which was changed from "Jia A" in 2004, as the top of a league hierarchy that extends to four leagues. Jia in Chinese also means "First" or "Best". Since its foundation the Super League has been relatively unstable, and has struggled to maintain popularity. In 2016, the average attendance of the CSL was 24,159 making it one of the highest attending professional football league around the world.

At the international level, Chinese football has enjoyed little success despite the amount of support it receives from fans. Although the national team qualified for the 2002 FIFA World Cup, they failed to score a single goal and lost three group matches. Conversely, the women's national team has finished second at both the World Championships and the Olympic Games. Despite the Chinese women's team's success at international competitions, however, women's football in China does not receive nearly as much attention as their counterparts in Canada and the United States, therefore China's good trend in women's football may well come to an end in the near future. In 1991, China hosted the inaugural Women's World Cup in Guangzhou; in 2004, it hosted AFC Asian Cup.

Football has always been among the more popular amateur team sports for recreation in China. High schools often have football facilities, some of which are rented on weekends to local amateur teams to organize matches. It is also popular to watch on television, with large international tournaments such as the World Cup and the European Championships, as well as major European leagues receiving widespread coverage.

Golf

Golf tournaments in China include the WGC-HSBC Champions in Shanghai, TCL Classic in Sanya on Hainan island, the Volvo China Open and the BMW Asian Open, played in the PRC. The most successful Chinese male golfer has been Zhang Lian-wei.  The most successful Chinese female golfer is Feng Shanshan. The Mission Hills Golf Club golf course at Guanlan in Shenzhen is said to be the world's largest.

At the amateur level, golf is seen as the top recreational sport for businesspeople and officials. Because of their relatively high position in Chinese society, they are usually the only people with access to the sport of golf on mainland China. At the 2007 National People's Congress, caving in to the popular acknowledgment that the building of new golf courses is not only a waste of public funds but an illegal use of space, Premier Wen Jiabao said in his Work Report to the Congress that contracts in building new golf courses should be highly discouraged and Communist party officials are banned from playing.

Ice hockey

Ice hockey is a minority sport but growing in popularity. The Kunlun Red Star is a professional team that plays in the Kontinental Hockey League since 2016.

Kickboxing
Kickboxing promotions such as Kunlun Fight have been started in recent years. Wu Lin Feng is also a long running promotion.

Lacrosse
The China national lacrosse team has qualified for the World Lacrosse Championship two consequtive times (2014 and 2018). China has also sent national teams to the Under-19 World Lacrosse Championships.

Motor racing
The Macau Grand Prix is held since 1954, known for its Formula 3, touring car and superbikes races. Macau was transferred to China in 1999.

The first international motor race in mainland China was the 1994 edition of the 3 Hours of Zhuhai, held at the Zhuhai Street Circuit as a round of the 1994 BPR Global GT Series. The Chinese Grand Prix is a Formula One event that has been held at the Shanghai International Circuit since 2004. The same circuit has hosted the 6 Hours of Shanghai, a round of the FIA World Endurance Championship, since 2012.

Ma Qinghua became the first Chinese driver to win an FIA World Championship race when he won the second of two races at the 2014 FIA WTCC Race of Russia, his debut meeting in the World Touring Car Championship. Ma had previously become the first Chinese driver to drive an F1 car at a Grand Prix meeting when he drove in the first free practice session for the HRT Formula 1 Team at the 2012 Italian Grand Prix.

Zhou Guanyu became the first Chinese Formula 1 driver after making his debut at the 2022 Bahrain Grand Prix.

Rugby union

Rugby union is becoming a more popular sport in China, than it previously has been. However, it is still not overly popular. China became affiliated to the International Rugby Board in 1997 and is currently ranked 67th in the world. The national team has not qualified for a world cup so far. One segment of Chinese society where rugby is particularly popular is the military. Rugby is an official sport of the People's Liberation Army, with the PLA Sports Institute participating in the highly competitive Hong Kong leagues.

Notable Chinese rugby players include Zhang Zhiqiang ("Johnny Zhang"), who had a stint with the famous Leicester Tigers club in England, and promising young speedster Li Yang, who boasts a time of 10.6 seconds in the 100-meter sprint.

Snooker

Although pool or, more specifically, billiards, has long been a popular street recreation sport in China, snooker's popularity has increased over the last few years in China. It can partly be attributed to the ascension of Ding Junhui who was once the number one ranked professional player and reached the final of the 2016 World Snooker Championship. More and more young Chinese players are breaking onto the professional circuit such as Liang Wenbo and Liu Chuang who both qualified for the last 32 of the 2008 World Snooker Championship, with Liang going on to reach the quarterfinals, where he faced a snooker legend Ronnie O'Sullivan. Snooker is played by an estimated 50 million Chinese people, and there are now over 300 snooker clubs in Beijing alone. China hosts several major professional ranking snooker tournaments.

Speed skating
There are six indoor speed skating arenas (Changchun, Daqing, Harbin, Qiqihar, Shenyang and Ürümqi). Three of the outdoor ovals were opened in 2012 (Fukang, Karamay, and Wangqing).

Table tennis (ping pong)

Ping pong is the official name for the sport of table tennis in China. Apart from the national representative team, the table tennis community in China continues to produce many world-class players, and this depth of skill allows the country to continue dominating recent world titles after a short break during the 1990s. The overwhelming dominance of China in the sport has triggered a series of rules changes in the International Table Tennis Federation and as part of the Olympics. Ma Long is currently one of the highest-ranked Chinese table tennis players, and the highest-ranked player in the world. Deng Yaping is regarded by many as one of the greatest table tennis players of all time, along with Zhang Jike, Liu Guoliang, and Kong Linghui.

The sport played an important role in China's international relations; in April 1972, the U.S. table tennis team were invited to visit China, an event later called "Ping-pong diplomacy". Table tennis is the biggest amateur recreational sport in China with an estimated 300 million players.

Tennis

Tennis is a growing recreational sport in China, although access to courts can be limited in densely populated urban areas. Recently Chinese tennis players, especially women, have seen success internationally both at the amateur level and professionally. International tennis tournaments receive wide coverage on Chinese sporting channels, being the third most popular after football and basketball.

Volleyball
Volleyball arrived in Asia in 1908 and was officially introduced to China in 1910. The Chinese Volleyball Association represents China in the Fédération Internationale de Volleyball and the Asian Volleyball Confederation, as well as the representing the volleyball sports in the All-China Sports Federation.

The China women's national volleyball team is one of the leading squads in women's international volleyball, having twice won the Olympic title (1984 and 2004). China took five consecutive World titles in the 1980s, the FIVB Volleyball Women's World Cup in 1981 and 1985, and the FIVB Volleyball Women's World Championship in 1982 and 1986. Although it experienced unstable development in the 1990s, the team won the 2003 FIVB World Grand Prix, captured the gold medal in the 2004 Summer Olympics, claimed the 2015 FIVB World Cup, and finished second at the 2013 FIVB World Grand Prix and the 2014 FIVB World Championship.

The China men's national volleyball team represents China in international volleyball competitions and friendly matches. The team twice took part in the Summer Olympics, finishing in eighth place at the 1984 Summer Olympics in Los Angeles, California, and 5th place in the 2008 Summer Olympics.

Since 1956, the men's national team has taken part in eleven World Championships, with its best results in Italy (1978) and Argentina (1982), where it finished seventh. The team also placed ninth three times, in France (1956), the Soviet Union (1962), and Czechoslovakia (1966). In 2002 in Argentina, China was 13th as a new rebuilding phase got off the ground. China took part in the opening edition of the top-class Volleyball World League in 1990 and regularly participated between 1992 and 1997, finishing sixth in 1996.

China featured national teams in beach volleyball that competed at the 2018–2020 AVC Beach Volleyball Continental Cup in both the women's and the men's sections.

Wushu 

Wushu is a professional sport in China and is also an academic field. The Chinese Wushu Association (CWA) has managed the progress of wushu in China since its formation in 1958 which has resulted in a system of provincial and municipal organizations which host various events and competitions. Wushu is promoted at every age and experience level. The CWA has had great influence on the International Wushu Federation, especially on how wushu is judged, managed, and promoted.

China is the most successful nation at the World Wushu Championships, having won 232 medals, 218 of them gold, since the first competition in 1991. China has also been very successful at other IWUF-related events including the World Junior Wushu Championships, Taolu World Cup, and Sanda World Cup, as well as the sports appearance at multi-sport events such as the Asian Games, the defunct East Asian Games, World Games, World Combat Games, and others. China has also had great successes at the 2008 Beijing Wushu Tournament and 2014 Nanjing Youth Wushu Tournament where wushu was a demonstration event at the 2008 and 2014 Olympic celebrations.

Many retired wushu taolu athletes have had great success as film actors, one of the most notable being Jet Li. Many sanda fighters have had great success at other disciplines of fighting such as MMA, Shootfighting, and Kickboxing.

Competitive results

Overview
Back in March 1959, at the 25th World Table Tennis Championships held in Germany, the table-tennis player Rong Guotuan won the first world title in China's sporting history. It was followed by many more successes. By the end of 2004 Chinese athletes had altogether won 1,800 world championships and broken 1,119 world records. In the 16 years since 1989, Chinese athletes have won 1,446 world championships, accounting for 80.3% of the total, and had broken 737 world records, making up 65.9% of the total. It was a period when China's competitive sports developed continuously and rapidly. At the 2008 Olympics, China made its best ever Olympic showing, with a tally of 100 medals, including 51 golds, 21 silvers and 28 bronzes, coming first in the medals table, achieving a major breakthrough in China's sporting history.

The results in competitive sports were down to a training system which is constantly being perfected. It is based on youth amateur sports schools and basic-level clubs, with teams representing localities as the backbone, and the national team at the highest level. The training system ensures that China elite teams maintain a year-round squad of some 20,000 athletes.

Olympic Games

In July 2001, Beijing finally succeeded in its bid to bring the 2008 Summer Olympics. The Beijing Organizing Committee for the Games of the XXIX Olympiad (BOCOG), established at the end of 2001, set the themes for the 2008 Games as "Green Olympics", "high-tech Olympics" and "Humanistic Olympics". Seven venues, including the National Stadium and the National Swimming Center have ushered in a new period of contemporary architecture for Beijing. The centerpiece of the 2008 Games was "the bird's nest" National Stadium. With a capacity of 91,000 spectators, the stadium hosted the opening and closing ceremonies as well as track-and-field events.

Since 1949, China has participated in eight Summer Olympics and nine Winter Olympics, winning 385 medals at the Summer Olympics and 44 medals at the Winter Olympics. At the Los Angeles, Barcelona and Atlanta Olympics, China came fourth in the gold medals table, second at the Athens & London Olympics, and first at the Beijing Olympics.

Asian Games

National Games

Anti-doping
In 2004, the State Council published its Anti-Doping Regulations, which have been in force since March 1, 2004.

Mao’s policy that emphasizes sports 
During Mao’s rule in China from 1949 to 1976, sports were first seen as a militarized and socialist movement in which all men and women were required to take part. Mao felt it was imperative to build people’s health in order to maintain and defend the nation. Sports inspired a collective work effort that united the country in the spirit of socialism allowing women to gain greater equality. In 1952, at the June inaugural meeting of the All-China Sports Federation, he called on the Chinese people to “Develop physical culture and sport, and strengthen the physique of the people.” In 1953, during a speech on behalf of the Presidium of the Second National Congress of the New Democratic Youth League of China, Mao said: “Now we must make sure that everybody, including workers, peasants, soldiers, students and cadres, can keep fit. Of course, it does not necessarily mean that if you are in good health you will be good at study, for study must be done in the proper way… Now it is necessary to arrange some recreation for which there must be time and facilities, and this end should be firmly grasped too. The Party Central Committee has decided to cut down the number of meetings and study hours, and you must see to it that this decision is carried out. Challenge anyone who refuses to do so. In short, young people should be able to keep fit, study well and work well.”

Gender Equality Maoist Era 
Chinese female athletes were able to step into the role of the “woman warrior,” a figure that won glory for the nation during the Maoist period. This figure of the female warriors (wudan) has existed down the centuries and is a stock character in martial arts novels (wuxia xiaoshuo) and other literary texts, and operas (wuxi). Rural women were at the forefront of this movement due to their predisposition in the countryside bringing them towards sports. This is due to Chinese sport typically being associated with lower class individuals, especially peasants, in the historically hierarchical male dominated society. Secondly, the very nature of peasant labor requires a strong physique and mental toughness, typically associated with rural women during the Cultural Revolution. Through Mao’s movement, women gained respect across the country but still fought for the rights to full equality. Lou Dapeng, Vice-President of the Chinese Track and Field association, is reported as saying that “It has been our policy to concentrate on women's sports.” The swimming Coach Chen Yungpeng also said that “the outstanding achievements made by female athletes… have encouraged Chinese sports authorities to channel more funds and manpower to women's events than to mens, resulting in wider participation and higher technical standards among women.” Although the future looked bright for women in sports, a common theme was “Chinese first, women second.” In connection with the official policy of giving women priority in sports, the justification was frequently made by Chinese sources that their sport women are Chinese first and women second. In other words, their Chinese identity is more important than their gender identity.

National fitness post Maoist Era 
The "Physical Health Law of the People's Republic of China" was adopted in 1995. In the same year, the State Council promulgated the "Outline of Nationwide Physical Fitness Program", followed by a series of rules and regulations. A survey released by the State Physical Culture Administration indicates that at present 33.9% of the population between 7 and 70 exercise regularly and 60.7% of the urban population go to sports clubs to engage in fitness activities. It is expected that by the end of 2005, 37% of China's total population will participate in regular physical exercises, and that over 95% of students will meet the National Physical Exercise Standard. Aiming to improve the health and the overall physical condition of the general population, the Nationwide Physical Fitness Program, with an emphasis on young people and children, encourages everyone to engage in at least one sporting activity every day, learn at least two ways of keeping fit and have a health examination every year.

In this 15-year-long program, the government aims to build a sport and health-building service system for the general public. There are about 620,000 gymnasiums and stadiums across China, open to and widely used by the public. Outdoor fitness centers have been installed in urban communities in public parks, squares, schoolyards, and other convenient locations. All communities and neighborhoods in Beijing are equipped with fitness facilities that meet the national standard. Building on what it already had, Tianjin has instituted large-scale expansion of its outdoor and indoor fitness facilities and stadiums. 2004 saw the completion of China's first large fitness arena with a floor area in excess of 10,000 m2.

Starting in 2001, the State Physical Culture Administration has set aside the proceeds of the sports lottery as pilot funds, in order to build "China Sports Lottery Nationwide Physical Fitness Centers" as pilot projects in 31 large and medium-sized cities throughout the country, including Dalian, Beijing and Changchun. Some of these centers have already been built. Meanwhile, some 196 million yuan of sports lottery proceeds were used to construct public sporting facilities in China's less-developed western areas and in the Three Gorges region of the Yangtze River, supporting 101 counties and towns.

With the increase in nationwide fitness activities, people's outlook on life has also changed. In many large and medium-sized cities, spending money in the pursuit of good health has become trendy. New sports such as rock climbing, horsemanship, bungee jumping, bowling, skateboarding, women's boxing, shuffleboard, taekwondo, and golf are particularly popular among young people. At the end of 2003, work was started on China's first snow golf course in A'er Mountain, Inner Mongolia. This project, representing an investment of about 1 billion yuan, will be the sixth snow golf course in the world.

The Nationwide Physical Fitness Program has set targets that, by 2010, about 40% of China's population will participate in regular physical exercise, there will be a clear improvement in the national physique and a major increase in the number of fitness sites so as to satisfy people's needs for keeping fit.

Between 1990 and 2002 the average life expectancy of China's population increased by 3.25 years, reaching 71.8 years, approaching the level of moderately developed countries. The latest survey of the national health, which ended in October 2001, extended over three years and 31 provinces, autonomous regions and municipalities directly under the Central Government, making it China's largest ever in terms of scale and population numbers. The survey showed an increase in the growth of children and teenagers in China's rural areas, every index showing an average rate of increase surpassing that of same age group children in the cities. But the survey also revealed some grounds for concern. Chinese people's physical faculties drop sharply after they turned 40.

In cities obesity poses a big threat to the health of children, teenagers, and adults. The health of women in rural areas is far from satisfactory. Based on the survey findings, relevant departments of the government continuously study methods of keeping fit, set new ways and standards for different age groups and strengthen instruction at community level.

Youth sports
Schools have professional physical educators and exercise facilities and students failing to reach the required physical standards are not allowed to go on to higher schools. Spring and autumn sports meets are annual events. The National Middle School Games and National University Games are held every four years. Promising teenagers are sent to amateur sports schools to receive specialized training.

There are also many youth sports clubs. In recent years, using sports lottery proceeds, the State Physical Culture Administration has established some 500 juvenile sports clubs a year. There were some 3,000 such clubs by the end of 2005.

Because Chinese athletes generally start their sporting careers at a young age, some receive little education and often struggle to find a job when they retire, with a 2012 study of the State General Administration of Sports learning that almost half the sportspeople failed to find employment. The government body then started to organize retraining courses to help them learn new skills and get jobs.

Traditional sports

Traditional sports with distinct Chinese characteristics are also very popular, including martial arts, taijiquan (shadow boxing), qigong (deep breathing exercises), xiangqi (Chinese chess), weiqi (known as "Go" in the West) and Mahjong.

Taijiquan is a kind of Chinese boxing, combining control of breath, mind and body. It emphasizes body movement following mind movements, tempering toughness with gentleness and graceful carriage.

Qigong is a unique Chinese way of keeping fit. It aims at enhancing health, prolonging life, curing illness and improving physiological functions by concentrating the mind and regulating the breath. There are various entertaining and competitive sports activities in the minority-inhabited areas, for example, wrestling and horsemanship among Mongols, Uygurs and Kazaks; Tibetan yak racing; Korean "seesaw jumping"; crossbow archery among the Miao, and dragon-boat racing among the Dai ethnic minority.

Xiangqi and weiqi were two of the five sports featured at the 2008 World Mind Sports Games held in Beijing.

Sports business
Since the 2010s, Chinese corporations like China Media Capital, CITIC Group, Fosun International and Wanda Group have invested heavily in international sports businesses, including marketing and media companies like Infront and MP & Silva, and teams like City Football Group, Aston Villa F.C., Wolverhampton Wanderers, RCD Espanyol, Atlético Madrid, Inter Milan, SK Slavia Prague, FC Sochaux and ADO Den Haag.

Sports industry stages
China's sports industry has gone through three stages. The first was the Exploratory Stage, from 1978 to 1992. The second was the formative stage, from 1993 to 1996. The third is the development stage, from 1997 to the present.

See also
 Chinese fitness dancing
 List of multi-sport events held by China
Sport in Hong Kong
Sport in Macau
Sport in Taiwan

Bibliography
Susan Brownell: Training the Body for China: Sports in the Moral Order of the People's Republic, University of Chicago Press, 1995, 
Dong Jinxia: Women, Sport and Society in Modern China: Holding Up More Than Half the Sky, Routledge, 2002, 
Guoqi Xu: Olympic Dreams: China and Sports, 1895-2008, Harvard University Press, 2008, 
Hong Fan: Footbinding, Feminism and Freedom: The Liberation of Women's Bodies in Modern China (Cass Series—Sport in the Global Society), Paperback Edition, Routledge 1997, 
Andrew D. Morris: Marrow of the Nation: A HIstory of Sport and Physical Culture in Republican China, University of California Press, 2004, 
James Riordan, Robin Jones (ed.): Sport and Physical Education in China, Routledge 1999,

References

External links
State General Administration of Sport 
All-China Sports Federation  
Chinese Olympic Committee
Beijing 2008 Olympic Games
NBA in China
NBA | Great Wall of Numbers
USATODAY.com - China embraces basketball

 

mt:Sport fiċ-Ċina